MySQL Connector/ODBC, once known as MyODBC, is computer software from Oracle Corporation. It is an ODBC interface and allows programming languages that support the ODBC interface to communicate with a MySQL database. MySQL Connector/ODBC was originally created by MySQL AB.

History
 3.51 - ANSI version only.
 5.1 - Unicode version only. Suitable for use with any MySQL server version since MySQL 4.1, including MySQL 5.0, 5.1, and 6.0.
 5.2 - ANSI and Unicode versions available at install time.
 5.3 - ANSI and Unicode versions available at install time. Conforms to the ODBC 3.8 specification.

External links
 Download Connector/ODBC
 'MySQL Connector/ODBC Developer Guide' – main manual

Data access technologies 
Application programming interfaces